Ludwig Julius Eisenberg (5 March 1858 in Berlin, Kingdom of Prussia – 25 January 1910 in Vienna, Austria-Hungary) was an Austrian writer and encyclopedist. He wrote a lexicon of stage artists, among other publications.

Publications  

 Das geistige Wien 
 (with Richard Groner) Volume 1, 1889 Das geistige Wien. Mittheilungen über die in Wien lebenden Architekten, Bildhauer, Bühnenkünstler, Graphiker, Journalisten, Maler, Musiker und Schriftsteller
 (with Richard Groner) Volume 2, 1890 Das geistige Wien. Mittheilungen über die in Wien lebenden Architekten, Bildhauer, Bühnenkünstler, Graphiker, Journalisten, Maler, Musiker und Schriftsteller. Künstler- und Schriftsteller Lexikon
 Volume 3, 1891 Künstler- und Schriftsteller-Lexikon Das geistige Wien. Mittheilungen über Wiener Architekten, Bildhauer, Bühnenkünstler, Graphiker, Journalisten, Maler, Musiker und Schriftsteller
 Volume 4, 1892 "Supplementband" Künstler- und Schriftsteller-Lexikon Das geistige Wien. Mittheilungen über Wiener Architekten, Bildhauer, Bühnenkünstler, Graphiker, Journalisten, Maler, Musiker und Schriftsteller (Digitalisat)
 Volume 5, 1893 Das geistige Wien
 Vol. 1: Belletristisch-künstlerischer Theil. Mittheilungen über die in Wien lebenden Architekten, Bildhauer, Bühnenkünstler, Graphiker, Journalisten, Maler, Musiker und Schriftsteller
 Vol. 2: Medicinisch-naturwissenschaftlicher Theil. Mittheilungen über Wiener Fachschriftsteller und Gelehrte auf dem Gebiete der Medicin (nebst Thierheilkunde und Pharmacie) und Naturwissenschaften (Digitalisat)
 Von der Strecke. Ernste und heitere Geschichten aus dem Eisenbahnleben. Brockhausen, Wien u. a. 1891.
 Johann Strauss. Ein Lebensbild. Breitkopf & Härtel, Leipzig 1894 (Digitalisat)
 Adolf von Sonnenthal. Eine Künstlerlaufbahn als Beitrag zur modernen Burgtheater-Geschichte. With a foreword by Ludwig Speidel. Pierson, Dresden 1896 (2nd, extended edition as Adolf Sonnenthal. Eine Künstlerlaufbahn. Als Beitrag zur Geschichte des modernen Burgtheaters. ebenda 1900) (Digitalisat)
 Ludwig Eisenberg's Großes Biographisches Lexikon der Deutschen Bühne im XIX. Jahrhundert. Verlag Paul List, Leipzig 1903 ( includes about 3.000 artist biographies)

References

Sources 
 Hermann Clemens Kosel (editor): Biographien der Wiener Künstler und Schriftsteller (Deutsch-österreichisches Künstler- und Schriftsteller-Lexikon. vol. 1). Gesellschaft für Graphische Industrie, Vienna 1902.
 N.N.: Ludwig Eisenberg. In Walther Killy (editor): Deutsche Biographische Enzyklopädie (DBE). 1st edition. Vol. 3: Ebinger–Gierke. K.G. Saur, Munich 1996, .

External links 

 
 Allgemeine Kunstchronik. Illustrierte Zeitschrift für Kunst, Kunstgewerbe, Musik, Theater und Litteratur. ZDB-ID 548851-5.
 Trauungsbuch Österreich, Niederösterreich, Wien: Matriken der Israelitischen Kultusgemeinde 1784-1911, Bezirk: Innere Stadt
 Gruppe 22, Nr. 23.
 Ludwig Eisenberg Ehrengrab auf dem Hietzinger Friedhof bei viennatouristguide.at
 Johann-Strauss-Gesellschaft (editor): Johann Strauss (son) - Leben und Werk in Dokumenten Band VII, 1894. Schneider; Tutzing 1998. , .

1858 births
1910 deaths
Writers from Berlin
German encyclopedists